Gian Friesecke (born 26 November 1994) is a Swiss racing cyclist, who last rode for UCI Continental team .

Major results
2017
 6th Tour du Jura
 7th Tour de Berne
 8th Rund um Köln
 10th Rad am Ring
 10th Poreč Trophy
2018
 3rd Tour de Vendée
 8th Poreč Trophy
2019
 2nd Grand Prix Gazipaşa
 5th Overall Tour d'Eure-et-Loir
1st  Mountains classification
 9th Overall Tour du Jura Cycliste

References

External links

1994 births
Living people
Swiss male cyclists
Place of birth missing (living people)